Aqcheh Gonbad (also Romanized as Āqcheh Gonbad; also known as Āghcheh Gonbad, Aghcheh Gonbad, Āqcheh Kand, Āqjakūmbez, Āq Jāqumbez, and Āqjeh Gonbad) is a village in Shivanat Rural District, Afshar District, Khodabandeh County, Zanjan Province, Iran. At the 2006 census, its population was 449, in 100 families.

References 

Populated places in Khodabandeh County